"She Looks So Perfect" is a song by Australian pop rock band 5 Seconds of Summer, taken from their self-titled debut album, 5 Seconds of Summer (2014). The song was digitally released in Australia on 23 February 2014 and in Europe on 23 March 2014 through Capitol Records and Hi or Hey Records, as their debut single with a major record label. The accompanying music video was released on 24 February 2014. The song peaked at number one in Australia, New Zealand, Ireland and the United Kingdom. It was certified triple platinum by the Australian Recording Industry Association for selling 210,000 copies. The song also won "Song of the Year" at the ARIA Music Awards in 2014. Ed Sheeran covered the song on Capital FM.

Background
"She Looks So Perfect" has been described as pop punk, power pop and pop rock. It was written by band members Michael Clifford and Ashton Irwin along with Jake Sinclair, who also produced the song, with additional production by Eric Valentine. The single is the leading track on the band's She Looks So Perfect EP, and is the first track on the band's self-titled debut studio album.

Critical reception

Lewis Corner of Digital Spy gave the song a mixed review, stating that:
"While their influences clearly nod towards pop-punk godfathers Green Day and Blink-182, 5SOS's official debut 'She Looks So Perfect' is strewn with teen heartthrob clichés. "We worked too damn hard for this just to give it up now," Luke tells his flame over a plucky electric guitar, before the song bursts into a lofty chorus and further promises of diamond rings and plane tickets. It's the age-old tale of a forbidden romantic runaway; trouble is, with this anthem poised to scale the chart, slipping away unnoticed will soon prove slightly more difficult.

The Wire wrote that the song sounds as if it were purposely crafted as power pop to appeal to fans of a boy band, but an "infinitesimally edgier" boy band than One Direction. Billboard called the song "school rock" and described it as a "slick crowd pleaser" performed live for the 2014 Billboard Music Awards show. Rachael McArthur of Renowned for Sound gave a mixed review stating, "The vocals are very polished and boy-bandy and delivered with great enthusiasm." However was critical of the lyrics more specifically the line, "I'm so down" during the chorus calling it, "a little annoying." In 2018, the song was ranked twentieth by Billboard in their compilation of the 100 Greatest Boyband Songs of All Time.

Chart performance
On 1 March 2014, "She Looks So Perfect" debuted at number three on the Australian ARIA Singles Chart, being kept off the top spot by Clean Bandit's "Rather Be" and Pharrell Williams' "Happy". The song finally reached number one on its fifth week on the chart, as well as being certified Platinum for sales of 70,000 copies. Likewise, it debuted at number four on the New Zealand Singles Chart and in its fifth week, the song jumped from number nine to number one. The week after, it was certified Gold.

"She Looks So Perfect" debuted at number one on the Irish Singles Chart on 27 March 2014. On 30 March, it debuted at number one on the UK Singles Chart with about 94,000 copies sold in first week. It was the fourth UK number one single by a band from Australia and the first since Madison Avenue's "Don't Call Me Baby", topped the chart in May 2000. In its second week, "She Look So Perfect" dropped to tenth place, which is the biggest drop from the top spot since McFly's double single "Baby's Come Back"/"Transylvania", who tie this record with Elvis Presley's re-release "One Night"/"I Got Stung" from 2005 and dropped from number one to number 20 in April 2007.

"She Looks So Perfect" entered on the US Billboard Hot 100 on 12 April 2014. On 24 May 2014, six weeks after their debut, "She Looks So Perfect" reached number 37. A week later, the track reached its peak position at number 32, becoming the band's first top 40 single. As of December 2014, the single has sold 925,000 copies in the US.

Music video
The official music video was directed by Frank Borin. It was released to YouTube on 24 February 2014. It features the band singing, while men and women start dancing and removing clothing at stores and classrooms. As of May 2021, the video has logged over 287 million views on YouTube.

Extended play
An extended play was released and the version for streaming contains five tracks: "She Looks So Perfect", "Heartache on the Big Screen", "The Only Reason", "What I Like About You", and "Disconnected".

B-side
A B-side was released in 2016 which contains nine tracks: three "She Looks So Perfect" versions (Acoustic, Ash demo, Mikey demo), "Heartache on the Big Screen", "The Only Reason", "Disconnected", "Wherever You Are", "500 Years of Winter - Pizza Song", and "What I Like About You (Studio Mix)".

Track listing

Notes
 signifies an additional producer
 signifies a vocal producer

Personnel

Luke Hemmings – rhythm guitar, lead vocals
Michael Clifford – lead guitar, backing vocals
Calum Hood – bass guitar, lead vocals
Ashton Irwin – drums, backing vocals

"She Looks So Perfect"
Jake Sinclair – producer, engineer, background vocals, guitar, programming
Eric Valentine – additional production, mixing, mastering
Cian Riordan – engineer
Justin Long – assistant recording engineer

"Heartache on the Big Screen"
Dan Lancester – producer, vocal production, recording
Mike Duce – vocal production
Peter Miles – recording
Bunt Stafford-Clark – mastering

"The Only Reason"
Steve Robson – producer, mixing
Sam Miller – mixing
Bunt Stafford-Clark – mastering

"Disconnected"
John Feldmann – producer, mixing, recording
Zakk Cervini – additional engineering, programming
Ago Teppand – additional engineering, programming
Colin Cunningham – additional engineering, programming
Bunt Stafford-Clark – mastering

"What I Like About You"
John Feldmann – producer, mixing, recording
Zakk Cervini – additional engineering, programming
Ago Teppand – additional engineering, programming
Colin Cunningham – additional engineering, programming
Bunt Stafford-Clark – mastering

Photography
Tom van Schelven

Art direction and design
Richard Andrews

Charts

Weekly charts

Year-end charts

Certifications

Release history

See also
List of number-one singles of 2014 (Australia)
List of artists who have had number-one singles on the UK Official Download Chart

References

2014 singles
2014 songs
5 Seconds of Summer songs
ARIA Award-winning songs
Capitol Records singles
Number-one singles in Australia
Number-one singles in New Zealand
Number-one singles in Scotland
Power pop songs
Irish Singles Chart number-one singles
Song recordings produced by Eric Valentine
Song recordings produced by Jake Sinclair (musician)
Songs written by Jake Sinclair (musician)
Songs written by Ashton Irwin
Songs written by Michael Clifford (musician)
UK Singles Chart number-one singles